Christopher Charles Watts (also rendered Charles Christopher Watts; 6 May 1877–July 1958) was an Anglican bishop. He served in the southern African church as Bishop of St Helena and then Bishop of Damaraland.

Born in Kensworth, where his father, George Edward Oscar Watts, was Vicar. He was educated at Shrewsbury School and Corpus Christi College, Cambridge, graduating BA in 1899 and proceeding MA (Cantab) in 1904.

He was ordained deacon by Mandell Creighton, Bishop of London in St Paul's Cathedral at Trinitytide 1900, and priest by Arthur Winnington-Ingram, Bishop of London in St Paul's at Trinity 1901, serving as assistant curate of St Mark's, Noel Park (St Mark's Website). In 1907 he went out to Southern Africa, and began work as Priest-in-charge of Mbabane in Swaziland in the Diocese of Zululand, and headmaster of St Mark's European School (until 1920), and St Mark's Coloured School. In 1917, he was appointed Canon of St Peter's Cathedral, Vryheid and from 1918 he served as Archdeacon of Swaziland.

He returned to England in 1927, to his old parish of St Mark's, Noel Park, where he served as Vicar until 1929. In 1930, he assumed duties as Warden of Zonnebloem College, Cape Town. In 1931, however, he was chosen to be Bishop of St Helena, being consecrated as such in St. George's Cathedral, Cape Town, on St Barnabas' Day, 11 June 1931 by Francis Phelps, Archbishop of Cape Town, assisted by Theodore Gibson, Bishop of Kimberley and Kuruman, and Joseph Williams, retired Bishop of St John's. He was enthroned in St Paul's Cathedral, St Helena, on 12 July 1931.

Watts served as Administrator of the Diocese of Damaraland, in 1934–1935, and in 1935 was translated as second Bishop of Damaraland. He resigned his See in December 1938, and returned to live in South Africa. He served as Rector of Victoria West with Carnarvon, in the Diocese of Cape Town (1939–1940); and as Rector of Knysna (1940–1946); and Priest-in-charge of Riversdale (1946–1947), both in the Diocese of George. He retired in 1947.

Watts was married to Madoline Beatrice Adams in 1930.

References

The Times, 25 July 1958.

1877 births
1958 deaths
Alumni of Corpus Christi College, Cambridge
Anglican bishops of St Helena
Anglican bishops of Damaraland
20th-century Anglican Church of Southern Africa bishops